Highway 198 (AR 198, Ark. 198, and Hwy. 198) is a designation for three state highways in the Upper Arkansas Delta. A second route of  connects Highway 140 and Highway 77. A third route of  runs from US Highway 61 (US 61) near Grider east to the Sans Souci Landing on the Mississippi River. All routes are maintained by the Arkansas State Highway and Transportation Department (AHTD).

Route description

Trumann
Highway 198 begins at Highway 69 and Highway 214 in Trumann. This intersection is adjacent to exit 29 on Interstate 555 (I-555)/US 63, with Highway 214 continuing north from the intersection as a frontage road of the expressway. Highway 198 runs south as a frontage road briefly before turning due east through toward a residential section of Trumann. The highway intersects Highway 463, where it terminates.

Poinsett/Mississippi County
Highway 198 begins at Highway 140 northeast of Lepanto in eastern Poinsett County. The highway runs due east as a section line road before entering Mississippi County. In Mississippi County, the route curves around the Left Hand Chute of Little River and has an intersection with Highway 77 north of Bondsville, where it terminates.

Sans Souci
Highway 198 begins at US 61 in eastern Mississippi County south of Osceola. The route runs northeast through a heavy industrial area with several industrial facilities, including Big River Steel, Bunge Limited, Plum Point Energy, and Viskase. The route continues east to Sans Souci Landing on the Mississippi River, where it intersects CR 668 and terminates.

Major intersections

See also

 List of state highways in Arkansas

References

External links

198
Transportation in Poinsett County, Arkansas
Transportation in Mississippi County, Arkansas